Edgar Katzenstein (26 November 1879 – 17 July 1953) was a German rower. He competed in the men's eight event at the 1900 Summer Olympics.

References

External links

1879 births
1953 deaths
German male rowers
Olympic rowers of Germany
Rowers at the 1900 Summer Olympics
Sportspeople from Lisbon
German expatriates in Portugal
Rowers from Hamburg